Marian Piłka (born 16 June 1954 in Trąbki, Masovian Voivodeship) is a Polish politician. He was elected to the  Sejm on 25 September 2005, getting 14,761 votes in 18 Siedlce district as a candidate from the Law and Justice list.

He was also a member of Sejm 1991-1993, Sejm 1997-2001, and Sejm 2001-2005.

On 20 April 2007 he joined the new conservative party, the Right of the Republic.

See also
Members of Polish Sejm 2005-2007

External links
Marian Piłka - parliamentary page - includes declarations of interest, voting record, and transcripts of speeches.

1954 births
Living people
People from Garwolin County
Polish Roman Catholics
Christian National Union politicians
Law and Justice politicians
John Paul II Catholic University of Lublin alumni
Members of the Polish Sejm 2005–2007
Members of the Polish Sejm 1991–1993
Members of the Polish Sejm 1997–2001
Members of the Polish Sejm 2001–2005
Right Wing of the Republic politicians
20th-century Polish women politicians
21st-century Polish women politicians